Jarosław Kotewicz (born March 16, 1969 in Iława) is a retired Polish high jumper. His personal best jump is 2.30 metres, achieved in August 1995 in Zurich.

Competition record

External links

1969 births
Living people
Polish male high jumpers
Athletes (track and field) at the 1996 Summer Olympics
Olympic athletes of Poland
People from Iława
Sportspeople from Warmian-Masurian Voivodeship
Zawisza Bydgoszcz athletes